Tommy Carr (15 April 1882 – 17 May 1963) was an Australian rules footballer who played with St Kilda in the Victorian Football League (VFL).

References

External links 

1882 births
1963 deaths
Australian rules footballers from Victoria (Australia)
St Kilda Football Club players